Boris Ilyich Sokolovsky (born 9 December 1953) is a Russian professional basketball coach and former basketball player. Since 1986, he has worked as an assistant coach, first with the Soviet, and then with the Russian men's and women's national basketball teams. In 2009, he was named the best women's basketball coach in Russia.

Club playing career
Sokolovsky played basketball with several Soviet clubs, from 1971 to 1979.

Coaching career
Sokolovsky started working as a coach in 1979, in Kiev, Ukraine. Between 2010 and 2012, he was the head coach of the Russian women's national basketball team.

Personal
In 1983, Sokolovsky moved to Tajikistan, where he married Valentina, a national team basketball player. They have a son, Aleksei, and daughters Irina and Olga. Aleksei works as a basketball coach, while Irina and Olga are international basketball players.

See also 
 List of EuroBasket Women winning head coaches

References

Living people
1953 births
Russian basketball coaches
BC Avtodor coaches